Articles (arranged alphabetically) related to Mali include:



0-9
 2002 African Cup of Nations

A
 Abouta, Sedonoude
 ADEMA/Alliance pour la democratie au Mali
 African Photography Encounters
 Afrodita, el Jardín de Los Perfumes
 Air Mali International
 Amadou & Mariam
 Amaldeme
 American International School of Bamako
 AMUPI
 Arab Islamic Front of Azawad
 Architecture of Mali
 Arma people
 AS Bamako
 AS Biton
 AS Commune II
 AS Nianan
 AS Real Bamako
 AS Sigui
 AS Tata National
 Ascofaré, Abdoulaye
 Aya, Ibrahima
 Azaouad

B
 Bâ, Amadou Hampâté
 Bafing National Park
 Bagayogo, Issa
 Bagayoko, Mamadou
 Bajourou
 Bamako
 Bamako (film)
 Bambara (disambiguation)
 Bambara language
 Bandiagara Escarpment
 Bathily, Cheick
 Berber music
 Berthe, Mamadi
 Bògòlanfini
 Bokar, Tierno
 Boucle du Baoulé National Park
 Bozo languages
 Bozo people
 BRVM

C
 CEDRAB/The Centre de Documentation et de Recherches Ahmad Baba at Timbuktu
 Central Bank of West African States
 Centre Salif Keita
 Cercle Olympique de Bamako
 Chelle, Eric
 Chiwara
 Cisse, Ousmane
 Cissé, Souleymane
 Coat of arms of Mali
 Communications in Mali
 Compagnie Aerienne du Mali
 Complex Sportif Hérémakono
 Coulibaly, Adama
 Boubacar Coulibaly (footballer, born 1985)
 Moussa Coulibaly (disambiguation)
 Coulibaly, Soumaila
 Compagnie malienne pour le développement du textile
 Culture of Mali

D
 Damba, Fanta
 Demographics of Mali
 Diabaté, Massa Makan
 Diabaté, Toumani
 Diagho, Souéloum
 Diakité, Mourtala
 Diallo, Boucader
 Diallo, Mamadou
 Diallo, Sidibé Aminata
 Diallo, Yaya
 Diamoutene, Souleymane
 Diarra, Alpha Mandé
 Diarra, Boubacar (footballer, born 1979)
 Diarra. Boubacar (footballer, born 1994)
 Diarra, Drissa
 Diarra, Mahamadou
 Diawara, Fousseni
 Diawara, Nare
 Districts of Mali
 Djenné
 Djenné-Jeno
 Djimini
 Djinguereber Mosque
 Djoliba Athletic Club
 Dogon people
 Dogon blacksmiths
 Dogon languages
 Dogon people
 Doucoure, Mintou
 Doukantié, Vincent
 Drabo, Adama
 Dyula people

E
 Economy of Mali
 Education in Mali
 Environmental issues in Mali
 Etruscan Resources

F
 Fakoly, Doumbi
 Festival in the Desert
 Flag of Mali
 Foreign aid to Mali
 Foreign relations of Mali
 French language
 Fula language
 Fula people

G
 Gao International Airport
 Geography of Mali
 Gold in Mali
 African Goldfields Corporation Mali
 Amansie Resources and Gold Fields,
 Anglogold Ashanti Mali,
 Consolidated Mining Corporation
 IAMGold Corporation
 Morila Ltd
 North Atlantic Resources SARL,
 Oliver Gold Corporation Mali
 Randgold Resources Mali,
 Societé de Gestion et d'Exploitation des Mines d'Or de Kalana,
 Societé Miniere de Loulo,
 Societé Miniere de Syama,
 Somika SA
 Tamico Tambaoura Mining Company SA Mali
 Great Mosque of Djenné
 Griaule, Marcel
 Griot
 Guimba the Tyrant

H
 Haratin
 Hassānīya
 History of Mali
 Ghana Empire
 Mali Empire
 Songhai Empire
 Bambara Empire
 Kaarta/Kingdom of Kaarta
 Massina Empire
 Toucouleur Empire
 Federation of French West Africa.
 Mali Federation,
 Agacher Strip
 Agacher Strip War
 Tuareg Rebellion (disambiguation)
 Rassemblement pour le Mali

I
 Inland Niger Delta
 Institut d'Economie Rurale, Bamako
 Islam in Mali

J
 Jam sai
 Jegede, Tunde
 Jobarteh, Sona Maya

K
 Kabara, Mali
 Kanouté, Frédéric
 Kanté, Daouda
 Kanté, Koly
 Kanté, Mory
 Karamogo
 Kayes Airport
 Kébé, Jimmy
 Keïta, Balla Moussa
 Keita, Salif (musician)
 Keita, Salif (footballer)
 Keita, Seydou
 Khassonké
 Ko Kan Ko Sata
 Koité, Habib
 Konaré, Adame Ba
 Konaté, Djibril
 Konaté, Moussa
 Koné, Boubacar
 Konte, Amadou
 Kora (instrument)
 Kouyaté, Assane
 Fabou Kouyate, Garan
 Kouyaté, Kandia
 Kouyate, Moussa
 Koyra Chiini language

L
 Languages of Mali
 Liptako-Gourma Authority
 list of Architects from Mali
 List of writers from Mali
 List of airports in Mali
 List of birds of Mali
 List of cities in Mali
 List of Malian companies
 List of Malian films
 List of Malians
 List of national parks of Mali

M
 .ml
 Maafe Mali recipe
 Mahamat Bindi, Djamal
 Mahmud ibn Umar, Al-Qadi Aqib ibn
 Mali
 Mali (disambiguation)
 Mali Airways
 Mali at the 1964 Summer Olympics
 Mali at the 1972 Summer Olympics
 Mali at the 1980 Summer Olympics
 Mali at the 1984 Summer Olympics
 Mali at the 1988 Summer Olympics
 Mali at the 1992 Summer Olympics
 Mali at the 1996 Summer Olympics
 Mali at the 2000 Summer Olympics
 Mali at the 2004 Summer Olympics
 Mali at the Olympics
 Mali Federation
 Mali Music (singer)
 Mali national football team
 Mali national rugby union team
 Malian hip hop
 Malian Football Federation
 Malian Solidarity Bank
 Malien Cup
 Malien Premiere Division
 Malinké
 Malitel
 Mamma Haidara Memorial Library
 Manantali Dam
 Mandé
 Mandinka people
 Maninka language
 M'Bodji, Sara
 Media of Mali
 MMOTY
 Modibo Keita, first president
 Mopti Airport
 Military of Mali
 Minyanka language
 Music of Mali

N
 N'Diaye, Tenema
 National Library of Mali
 National Museum of Mali
 National Workers' Union of Mali
 Niger River
 Nommo
 Novagift

O
 Oil and gas in Mali
 Ben Et Company Mali
 Elf Oil Mali
 Ets Darhat
 ExxonMobil Mali
 Ministry of Mines, Energy and Water
 Mobil Oil Mali
 Shell Mali
 Société du Groupe Air Liquid
 Societe Naman Sarl Mali
 Societe Soleil Service Mali
 Station N'diaye Et Freres Mali
 Tamoil Mali
 Total Mali
 Total Texaco Mali
 Bamako Storage Depot
 Kabara Storage Depot
 Kayes Storage Depot
 SIR Refinery in Abidjan, Cote d'Ivoire
 SAR Refinery in Dakar, Senegal
 Ouologuem, Yambo

P
 Party for National Recovery (PARENA)
 Pavillon des sports Modibo Keita
 Pioneer Jazz
 Politics of Mali
 Popular Movement for the Liberation of Azawad
 Pour l'Afrique et pour toi, Mali

Q
 Qao or Gao, Mali

R
 Radio Bamako
 Radio Libre Kayira
 Rail Band
 Rally for Mali (RPM)
 Regions of Mali
 River of Sand Canadian documentary
 Roman Catholicism in Mali

S
 Sacko, Fanta
 Sahara Desert
 Sahel
 Samake, Soumaila
 Sangaré, Oumou
 Selingue Dam
 Ahmed Diane Semega
 Senou International Airport
 Senufo
 Sidi Yahya
 Sidibé, Djibril
 Sidibè, Mahamadou
 Sidibè, Mamady
 Sidibé, Rafan
 Sissoko, Baba
 Sissoko, Cheick Oumar
 Sissoko, Mohamed
 Songhai
 Songhay languages
 Soninke language
 Soninke people
 Soninke Wangara
 Sotelma
 Stade 26 mars
 Stade Abdoulaye Nakoro Cissoko
 Stade Amari Daou
 Stade Babemba Traoré
 Stade Barema Bocoum
 Stade Centre Salif Keita
 Stade Malien
 Stade Modibo Keïta
 Stade Municipal de Bamako
 Stade Municipal de Commune II
 Stade Municipal de Koulikoro
 Stade Municipal de USFAS
 Stade Omnisports (Sikasso)
 Sub-Saharan Africa
 Suppire-Mamara languages
 Supyire language

T
 Tadaksahak language
 Tamboura, Adama
 Tangara, Fousseni
 Tartit
 Taoudeni basin
 Temple, Robert K. G.
 Thiam, Brahim
 Tierno Bokar
 Timbuktu
 Timbuktu Airport
 Timbuktu Manuscripts Project
 Tinariwen
 Tomb of Askia
 Tommo So
 Toubab Krewe
 Toucouleur Empire
 Toucouleur people
 Tounkara, Djelimady
 Touré, Ali Farka
 Touré, Vieux Farka
 Traoré, Abdou
 Traoré, Alou
 Traoré, Aminata
 Traoré, Djimi
 Traoré, Dramane
 Traoré, Sammy
 Transport in Mali
 Traoré, Boubacar
 Traoré, Falaba Issa
 Traoré, Lobi
 Traoré, Rokia
 Tuareg
 Tuareg rebellion and Azawad

U
 University of Bamako
 USFAS Bamako
 URTEL

V
 Vie Sur Terre, La

W
 Wassoulou music
 West Africa
 Workers' Trade Union Confederation of Mali

X
 Xaasongaxango language
 Xalam

Y
 Yaya Keita, Sidi
 Yeelen

Z
 Zarma people

See also

 Lists of country-related topics - similar lists for other countries

 
Mali